Conscription in Russia (translated as "universal military obligation" or "liability for military service") is a 12-month draft, which is mandatory for all male citizens ages 18–27, with a number of exceptions. The mandatory term of service was reduced from two years to one year in 2007 and 2008. Avoiding the draft is a felony under Russian criminal code and is punishable by up to 2 years of imprisonment. Conscripts are generally prohibited from being deployed abroad.

History

Imperial Russia

Before Peter I, Russia formed the bulk of the military from the nobility and people who owned land on condition of service. During wars, additional recruiting of volunteers and ordinary citizens was common. Peter I introduced a regular army consisting of the nobility and recruits, including conscripts. The conscripts to the Imperial Russian Army were called "recruits" in Russia (not to be confused with voluntary recruitment, which did not appear until the early 20th century). The system was called "recruit obligation".

Russian tsars before Peter maintained professional hereditary musketeer corps (streltsy in Russian) that were highly unreliable and undisciplined. In times of war, Russia augmented the armed forces with peasant levies. Peter I formed the Imperial Russian Army built on the German model, but with a new aspect: the Army did not necessarily draw officers from the nobility, giving talented commoners promotions that eventually included a noble title at the attainment of an officer's rank. Russia organised the conscription of peasants and townspeople on a quota system per settlement. Initially, it based conscription on the number of households in a given area. Later it was calculated on population numbers.

The term of service in the 18th century was effectively for life, so long as an individual remained physically capable of service. In 1736 it was reduced to 25 years, with one male member of each family excluded from managing its property. In 1834 it was reduced to 20 years plus five years in the reserve, and in 1855 to 12 years plus three years of reserve liability.

After the Russian defeat in the Crimean War during the reign of Alexander II, the Minister of War Dmitry Milyutin introduced military reforms, with an initial draft presented in 1862. On January 1, 1874 , a statute concerning conscription was approved by the Tsar by which military service was generally made compulsory for males at the age of 21. The term of actual service was reduced for the land army to 6 years, followed by nine years in the reserve. This measure created a large pool of military reservists ready to be mobilized in the event of war while permitting the maintenance of a smaller active army during peacetime. Most naval conscripts had an obligation for seven years of service, reflecting the extended period required for technical training.

Immediately before the outbreak of World War I, the Imperial Government imposed compulsory service of three years for entrants to infantry and artillery regiments and four years for cavalry and engineers. After completing this initial period of full-time service, conscripts passed into the first class reserves for seven years. The final obligation for compulsory service ended at age 43, after eight years in the second reserves.

The large population in Russia permitted military service exemptions on a larger scale than in other European armies of the period. Muslims and members of certain racial or religious minorities were generally exempted from conscription, as was about half of the Russian Orthodox population. The Military of the Grand Duchy of Finland followed separate arrangements. An only son was not typically required to serve.

Soviet Union

The first all-union conscription law of 1925 was tailored for the mixed cadre-militia structure of the peacetime Red Army after the Civil War. Draft-age was 21 years. Terms of service varied between one year in territorial formations and 2 to 4 years in the cadre army. Only "workers and peasants" were seen worthy to serve in combat units. Men of other social backgrounds were restricted to rear or labor services or had to pay a military tax.

The 1936 Soviet Constitution declared military service a "sacred duty" of all Soviet citizens. The Constitution dropped any reservations regarding social or national background. A 1939 service law lowered the call-up age to 19. The Red army had adopted a full-cadre structure in the 1930s.

During the so-called Great Patriotic War, all non-disabled men of ages 18–51 were subject to draft except specialists declared vitally necessary in the domestic military/defense industry.

Soviet Armed Forces completed post-World War II demobilisation in 1948. A 1949 service law set service terms at three years in ground forces and four years in the navy.

Late Soviet Union

The late Soviet Armed Forces were manned by mandatory draft (with some exceptions) for all able-bodied males for 2 years (3 years for seagoing parts of the Navy and Border troops), based on the 1967 Law on Universal Military Service. A bi-annual call-up in spring and autumn was introduced then, replacing the annual draft in fall. The conscripts were normally sent to serve far away from their residence.

Men were subject to draft at the age of 18. The draft could be postponed due to continued education. However, since the early 1980s Soviet Union had a mandatory draft for students of most colleges/universities — the first mass student recruitment was in spring 1983, the maximum conscription fraction in 1987 — until it was abolished in the spring of 1989. Students were drafted for two or, if for the navy, three years of military service typically after termination (more seldom in the middle) of the first or second year of college.

Most universities had military departments which were in charge of military training of all non-disabled male students to become reserve officers of a particular military specialty depending on the university. At the moment of the Dissolution of the Soviet Union, there were 397 civilian institutions of higher education which had military departments, in whole USSR. There was the practice of the selective conscription of graduates of civilian institutions of higher education (universities, academies and, strictly speaking, institutions), who have graduated the military departments of their almae matres and received a commission as an officer, in the Soviet Union. Such a person could be conscripted from the reserve of armed forces to active duty, but until the age of 27 only; the period of active duty of such an officer was several years, and at the end of that period, he was due to be enlisted in the reserve of armed forces again. Such officers were called "blazers" in army's slang (for example, Anatoly Kvashnin was a "blazer").

Russian Federation
The two-year conscription term in force in the USSR after 1967 continued in Russia following the 1991 collapse of the Soviet Union until 2006, when the Government of Russia and State Duma gradually reduced the term of service to 18 months for those conscripted in 2007 and to one year from 2008, while dropping some legal excuses for non-conscription from the law (such as non-conscription of rural doctors and teachers, of men who have a child younger than 3 years, etc.) from 1 January 2008.

As of 2021, all male citizens aged 18–27 are subject to conscription for 1 year of active duty military service in armed forces, but the precise number of conscripts for each of the recruitment campaigns, which are usually held twice annually, is prescribed by particular Presidential Decree. Russian law provides some grounds for temporary postponement of and permanent exemption from military draft.

The conscription of graduates of civilian institutions of higher education, who have graduated the military departments of their universities and received a commission as an officer was abolished on 1 January 2008 when the amendments, contained in Federal Law of 6 July 2006, №104-FZ, entered into force.

On 5 November 2022, during the 2022 Russian invasion of Ukraine, president Vladimir Putin signed a decree allowing people convicted of serious crimes, including drug trafficking and murder, to be mobilized into the Russian army. The exemption does not include people convicted of sex crimes involving minors and crimes against the state, such as treason, spying or terrorism. This could allow "hundreds of thousands" of people to be mobilized. Putin subsequently claimed that 18,000 people have been mobilised over the goal of 300,000, which began in September.

See also
Cantonists
Dedovshchina

References

Further reading
 "Russian Military Complains About 'Low Quality' of Recruits as Spring Draft Begins." Associated Press. April 1, 2005. (Via Levis-Nexis).

External links
 Conscription through detention in Russia's armed forces
 Only eleven percent of Russian men enter mandatory military service.
 https://www.ipernity.com/doc/57114/5919363
 The Economic Cost of Soviet Military Manpower Requirements, RAND Corporation (1989)
 Conscription and Reform in the Russian Army (2004)

 
Military of Russia
Society of Russia
Russia